The Victoria may refer to several public houses in England:

 The Victoria, Bristol, Grade II* listed
 The Victoria, Bayswater, London
 The Victoria, Durham, Grade II listed
 The Victoria, Great Harwood, Lancashire
 The Victoria, Richmond, Grade II listed, in Richmond upon Thames

See also

 
 Victoria (disambiguation)
 La Victoria (disambiguation)
 The Victor (disambiguation)